Statistics of the Scottish Football League in season 1938–39.

Scottish League Division One

Scottish League Division Two

See also
1938–39 in Scottish football

 
Scottish Football League seasons